Rødekro is a railway town with a population of 5,950 (1 January 2022), which was the seat of the former Rødekro Municipality (Danish, kommune) in Aabenraa Municipality in Region of Southern Denmark on the Jutland peninsula in south Denmark.

Rødekro Municipality
The former Rødekro municipality covered an area of 202 km2, and had a total population of 11,695 (2005).  Its last mayor was Tove Larsen, a member of the Social Democrats (Socialdemokraterne) political party.

 Egvad Parish
 Hellevad Parish
 Hjordkær Parish
 Rise Parish
 Øster Løgum Parish

On 1 January 2007 Rødekro municipality ceased to exist as the result of Kommunalreformen ("The Municipality Reform" of 2007).  It was merged with Bov, Lundtoft, Tinglev,  and Aabenraa municipalities to form the new Aabenraa municipality.   This created a municipality with an area of 951 km2 and a total population of 60,151 (2005).  The new municipality  belongs to Region of Southern Denmark ("South Denmark Region").

Notable people 
 Anette Hoffmann (born 1971 at Egvad) a former Danish team handball player, twice team gold medallist at the 1996 and 2000 Summer Olympics
 Mike Andersen (born 1977 in Rødekro) a Danish blues and soul songwriter, guitarist, singer and bandleader
 René Bach (born 1990 in Hjordkær, Rødekro) a motorcycle speedway rider, member of Denmark U-21 national team
 Lea Hansen (born 1999 in Rødekro) a Danish handball player who currently plays for Silkeborg-Voel KFUM

External links
 The new Aabenraa municipality's official website (Danish only)

References

 Municipal statistics: NetBorger Kommunefakta, delivered from KMD aka Kommunedata (Municipal Data)
 Municipal mergers and neighbors: Eniro new municipalities map

Former municipalities of Denmark
Cities and towns in the Region of Southern Denmark
Aabenraa Municipality